CGS Aviation, Inc. is an American aircraft manufacturer based in Grand Bay, Alabama. The company was founded by Chuck Slusarczyk in the early 1970s in Broadview Heights, Ohio as Chuck's Glider Supplies. Today it is run by Danny Dezauche and specializes in the design and manufacture of ultralight aircraft in the form of kits for amateur construction and ready-to-fly aircraft in the US FAR 103 Ultralight Vehicles rules category.

History
The company started in the early 1970s as a hang glider manufacturer and aircraft parts supplier under the name Chucks' Glider Supplies. Founder Chuck Slusarczyk later carried out experiments with powered hang gliders and developed a reduction drive system to turn larger propellers more slowly to reduce noise and improve efficiency. He was granted a US patent for his system.

In October 1979 the company was renamed CGS Aviation, Inc.

In 1980 development of the CGS Hawk aircraft series was begun, starting with a survey of pilot expectations and desires for a new ultralight aircraft design.

Products
The Hawk line of ultralight aircraft was introduced at Sun 'n Fun, Lakeland, Florida, in March, 1982. The Hawk was the first fully enclosed ultralight, the first with fully strut-braced wings, three-axis controls, a steerable nose or tail wheel and wing flaps. The original 1982 CGS Hawk Classic remains in production in 2015.

The Hawk series includes the single seat Hawk Arrow, Hawk Plus, Hawk Sport, Hawk Ultra and AG-Hawk. Two seat models include the Hawk Classic II and the Hawk Arrow II. More than 1700 Hawks series aircraft have been flown.

The Hawk prototype was named Best New Design for 1982 at Sun 'n Fun in March 1982. At the EAA Convention in Oshkosh, Wisconsin that same year the Hawk was named Outstanding New Design and also Reserve Grand Champion. At Oshkosh 1983, the Hawk won the Dupont Kevlar Air Recreational Vehicle Design Competition against more than 126 other aircraft designs in the competition.

Aircraft

References

External links

Company website archives on Archive.org

Aircraft manufacturers of the United States
Ultralight aircraft
Homebuilt aircraft